Mackenzie Blackwood (born December 9, 1996) is a Canadian professional ice hockey goaltender for the  New Jersey Devils of the National Hockey League (NHL). Blackwood was the top-rated North American goaltender ranked in the NHL Central Scouting Bureau's final rankings for the 2015 NHL Entry Draft. He was selected by the Devils in the second round, 42nd overall, in the 2015 NHL Entry Draft.

Early life
Blackwood was born on December 9, 1996, in Thunder Bay, Ontario. His father was involved in local ice hockey teams, while his mother played basketball and track and field. He began playing ice hockey at the age of nine, comparatively late by Canadian standards, and temporarily quit after only a year. When he was 12 years old, the goaltender for Blackwood's youth hockey team was injured, and Blackwood volunteered to mind the net in his place. He enjoyed the new position and became a full-time goaltender. He played in house leagues with the Volunteer Pool Bearcats and Neebing Hawks before joining the Thunder Bay Kings of the Thunder Bay AAA Hockey League for the 2011–12 minor ice hockey season. There, he won 15 games while posting a 3.08 goals against average (GAA). The following season, he was recruited for the Elmira Sugar Kings of the Greater Ontario Junior Hockey League; the son of Elmira director of hockey operations Keith Stewart was a scout for the Barrie Colts of the Ontario Hockey League (OHL) and wanted Blackwood to gain a year of development in a lower-tier junior ice hockey league before he was drafted by a Junior A-level team.

Playing career

Junior
Following his performance in minor hockey, the Colts selected Blackwood in the fifth round of the 2012 OHL Priority Selection. Originally a backup during his rookie 2013–14 season, Blackwood became the Colts' starting goaltender early in the season when Mathias Niederberger left the team and Alex Fotinos struggled in the role. He earned his first shutout on November 1, stopping all 31 shots from the Niagara IceDogs. After leading all rookies in both the OHL and the Canadian Hockey League (CHL) with a 2.98 GAA and .902 save percentage (SV%) and leading OHL rookies with 23 wins, Blackwood was named to the OHL First All-Rookie Team in 2014. Although the Colts' OHL postseason run came to an end with a loss to the North Bay Battalion in the second playoff round, Blackwood was praised by coaches for his performance during the season, and he was expected to remain Barrie's starting goaltender for the remainder of his junior hockey career.

The following season, Blackwood was selected as a member of the OHL All-Stars for the 2014 Subway Super Series. He was also chosen to play the 2015 CHL/NHL Top Prospects Game, but was unavailable due to illness.

Professional
On December 30, 2015, Blackwood signed a three-year, entry-level contract with the New Jersey Devils, who had drafted him in the 2015 NHL Entry Draft. After playing for the Devils' American Hockey League (AHL) affiliate, Blackwood was assigned to the Adirondack Thunder, the Devils' ECHL affiliate, on January 1, 2018.

Blackwood began the 2018–19 season with the Devils' AHL affiliate, the Binghamton Devils. He was recalled to New Jersey on December 17 after goaltender Cory Schneider was placed on injured reserve. Blackwood made his NHL debut the following night in a 7–2 loss to the Toronto Maple Leafs. He replaced starter Keith Kinkaid in the third period and saved eight of ten shots. On December 20, Blackwood made his first NHL start against the Columbus Blue Jackets, and although the Devils lost 2–1, Blackwood had an impressive performance, saving 36 of 38 shots. On December 27, Blackwood recorded his first NHL win, a 5–2 victory over the Boston Bruins, with another strong performance, making 40 saves on 42 shots. In only his third NHL start, Blackwood recorded 37 saves to earn his first shutout in a 2–0 victory over the Carolina Hurricanes on December 29. Blackwood was named a Star of the Week following this performance. Following another shutout victory on December 31 against the Vancouver Canucks, Blackwood became the first Devils rookie goaltender to post back-to-back shutouts. He also became the youngest Devils goaltender to record multiple regular season shutouts, surpassing Martin Brodeur. On January 3, 2019, Blackwood was named to the North Division roster for the 2019 American Hockey League All-Star Classic. On January 10, Blackwood was placed on injured reserve by the Devils due to a lower body injury he suffered on January 2. He returned to the Devils lineup and played his first game since January 4 in a 3–2 win over the Philadelphia Flyers on January 12.

On December 23, 2020, the Devils re-signed Blackwood to a three-year contract.

International play

On June 24, 2015, Blackwood was one of only three goaltenders invited to attend Hockey Canada's U-20 summer development camp. He was one of three goaltenders who represented the Canadian junior team at the 2016 World Junior Ice Hockey Championships.

On April 29, 2019, Blackwood was named as the third-choice goaltender to the senior Canadian roster for the 2019 IIHF World Championship held in Slovakia. He made his debut for Canada in a relief appearance, replacing Carter Hart for nine minutes in a 5–0 round robin victory over Denmark on May 20. He earned a silver medal as Canada progressed through to the playoff rounds before losing the final to Finland on May 26.

Personal life
Blackwood was raised in Thunder Bay. His mother, Rhonda Crocker-Ellacott, is the President and CEO of the Thunder Bay Regional Health Sciences Centre. His father was a fan of the Colorado Avalanche and encouraged his son to cheer for them.

Career statistics

Regular season and playoffs

International

Awards and honours

References

External links
 

1996 births
Living people
Adirondack Thunder players
Albany Devils players
Barrie Colts players
Binghamton Devils players
Canadian ice hockey goaltenders
Ice hockey people from Ontario
New Jersey Devils draft picks
New Jersey Devils players
Sportspeople from Thunder Bay
Utica Comets players